Goeddel is a surname. Notable people with the surname include:

Erik Goeddel (born 1988), American baseball player
David Goeddel (born 1951), American molecular biologist, father of Erik and Tyler
Tyler Goeddel (born 1992), American baseball player